The 1949 ICF Canoe Slalom World Championships were held in Geneva, Switzerland under the auspices of International Canoe Federation. It was the inaugural edition.

Eight sets of medals were awarded. There were four individual events and four team events. The team events were just combined times of three selected athletes or crews from the individual events. Only two teams were classified in the men's C1 team, men's C2 team and women's folding K1 team events.

Medal summary

Men's

Canoe

Kayak

Women's

Kayak

Medals table

References

External links
International Canoe Federation

Icf Canoe Slalom World Championships, 1949
Icf Canoe Slalom World Championships, 1949
ICF Canoe Slalom World Championships
International sports competitions hosted by Switzerland
Sports competitions in Geneva
20th century in Geneva
Canoeing in Switzerland